Batesville High School (BHS) is a public high school in Batesville, Indiana. The high school is part of the Batesville Community School Corporation and has an enrollment of 700.

History
1875 marked the erection of the Batesville schoolhouse which was a two-story, four room brick building. To keep up with the increasing population there was an addition made to the schoolhouse in 1888, and in 1896 a second schoolhouse was built. As the town continued to grow it became apparent that a separate high school was needed. Batesville High School was constructed in 1927 on a large plot of land donated to the Batesville school system by George M. Hillenbrand. In 1963, the Batesville schools consolidated with the schools of Hamburg, St. Mary's and Oldenburg, which marks the beginning of the Batesville Community School Corporation. Due to the rapid growth of the school district from the consolidation it became necessary to build a new high school. Construction on the new high school finished in the fall of 1968, and still serves as the home to Batesville High School. Growing enrollment in the district has resulted in a $12 million addition to the school in 2000 and a $10 million addition in 2017.

Athletics
Batesville High School is a member of the Eastern Indiana Athletic Conference. The Bulldogs compete in 19 Indiana High School Athletic Association sanctioned sports.

Boys
Baseball
Basketball
Cross country
Football
Golf
Soccer
Swimming
Tennis
Track and field
Wrestling
Dance
Girls
Basketball
Cross country
Golf
Soccer
Softball
Swimming
Tennis
Track and field
Volleyball
Dance

Notable alumni
 Curt Clawson - member of the U.S. House of Representatives from Florida's 19th congressional district
Chris Giesting - member of 2016 IAAF World Indoor Championships Gold medal winning 4 x 400 m relay team and 2012 NCAA Men's Division I Indoor Track and Field Championships distance medley national champion.
Bryan Hoeing - pitcher for the Miami Marlins.
Bryan Hutson Former member of several top quartets in Christian music and is also a member of The Gospel Music Hall Of Fame. He and his brother; Jim (also a BHS alumni) formed a local Christian band (based in Batesville) in 1985.

See also
 List of high schools in Indiana

References

External links
 Official website
Public high schools in Indiana
Schools in Franklin County, Indiana
1875 establishments in Indiana